Walker's Mill and Walker's Bank, also known as Simsville, Siddall's Mill, and "Big White Mill", is a historic spinning cotton mill and worker's dwelling block located near Wilmington, New Castle County, Delaware. Walker's Mill was built between 1813 and 1815, and is a -story, "T"-shaped, stone building.

History 
It measures approximately 100 feet by 225 feet and features a tower topped by a cupola. Walker's Bank is a two- to three-story rectangular stone building built in 1813 and consisting of four worker's homes. It measures 44 feet by 75 feet and each long side features a porch divided among the four units.

It was added to the National Register of Historic Places in 1972.

The Ashford family bought Walker's Mill and Walker's Bank in 2002. They renovated Walker's Mill into an office for their building, but did not find a use for Walker's Bank, which has limited parking and is under deed restrictions. It decayed to the point of near-collapse, and they applied for a demolition permit for it in 2018. After a nine-month delay for review by the New Castle County historic review board, the permit was granted late in the year.

References

External links

Industrial buildings and structures on the National Register of Historic Places in Delaware
Houses on the National Register of Historic Places in Delaware
Houses completed in 1815
Houses completed in 1813
Buildings and structures in Wilmington, Delaware
Historic American Buildings Survey in Delaware
Cotton mills in the United States
Houses in New Castle County, Delaware
National Register of Historic Places in Wilmington, Delaware